The grey tit-flycatcher (Myioparus plumbeus) is a species of bird in the family Muscicapidae. It has an extensive but patchy distribution in sub-Saharan Africa.

Range and habitat

It is found in Angola, Benin, Botswana, Burkina Faso, Cameroon, Central African Republic, Chad, Republic of the Congo, Democratic Republic of the Congo, Eswatini, Ethiopia, Gabon, Gambia, Ghana, Guinea, Guinea-Bissau, Ivory Coast,Kenya, Liberia, Malawi, Mali, Mozambique, Namibia, Niger, Nigeria, Rwanda, Senegal, Sierra Leone, South Africa, South Sudan, Tanzania, Togo, Uganda, Zambia, and Zimbabwe.

Its natural habitats are subtropical or tropical dry forest and subtropical or tropical moist lowland forest.

References

External links
 Grey tit-flycatcher - Species text in The Atlas of Southern African Birds.

grey tit-flycatcher
Birds of Sub-Saharan Africa
grey tit-flycatcher
Taxonomy articles created by Polbot
Taxobox binomials not recognized by IUCN